Caroline Garcia and Kristina Mladenovic were the defending champions, but Garcia chose not to participate this year. Mladenovic played alongside Svetlana Kuznetsova, but lost in the third round to Bethanie Mattek-Sands and Lucie Šafářová. 

Mattek-Sands and Šafářová went on to win their second French Open title and their third successive Grand Slam title, defeating Ashleigh Barty and Casey Dellacqua in the final, 6–2, 6–1.

Seeds

Draw

Finals

Top half

Section 1

Section 2

Bottom half

Section 3

Section 4

References

External links
2017 French Open – Women's draws and results at the International Tennis Federation

Women's Doubles
2017 WTA Tour
2017